Lady Caroline Kininmonth (1907-1978) was a British artist, known for her paintings of flowers and landscapes in both oil and watercolours.

Biography
Kininmonth spent most of her life in Edinburgh and studied at the Edinburgh College of Art from 1926 to 1930. Working in oils, she painted still-life and botanic subjects plus rural scenes and landscapes. During the 1940s and 1950s she was a regular exhibitor at the Royal Scottish Academy, showing some twenty-five works there. Kininmonth also exhibited with the Scottish Society of Women Artists and the Royal Glasgow Institute of the Fine Arts. She was married to the architect Sir William Kininmonth and both Edinburgh University and the Arts Council of Scotland hold examples of her paintings.

References

External links
 

1907 births
1978 deaths
20th-century Scottish painters
20th-century Scottish women artists
Alumni of the Edinburgh College of Art
Artists from Edinburgh
Scottish women painters